Major General William O'Leary QVRM TD DL VR is retired senior British Army Reserve officer who served as Deputy Commander Field Army.

Military career
After serving for seven years as a soldier, O'Leary was commissioned as a reserve officer in the Royal Electrical and Mechanical Engineers ('REME') in 1988. He became commanding officer of 103 Battalion REME in 1999, Colonel Regional Forces in 2002 and Colonel Territorial Army Recruiting in 2005. He went on to be Deputy Brigade Commander of 145 (South) Brigade in 2008, Assistant Commander Theatre Troops in 2011 and Assistant Deputy Military Secretary in 2015. After that he became Deputy Commander Field Army in 2018. O'Leary retired from the British Army on 12 March 2020.

Business career
After training as an engineering and sales specialist, O'Leary has worked in international business development with MGI Coutier, an automotive systems manufacturer, since the late 1990s.

References

British Army generals
Living people
British businesspeople
Deputy Lieutenants of Buckinghamshire
Royal Electrical and Mechanical Engineers officers
Year of birth missing (living people)